Wheeling and Lake Erie Railway may refer to:

Wheeling and Lake Erie Railway (1990), a regional railroad
Wheeling and Lake Erie Railway (1916–1988), leased to the Nickel Plate Road in 1949 and merged into the Norfolk and Western Railway in 1988
Its predecessors:
 Wheeling and Lake Erie Railroad (1899–1916)
 Wheeling and Lake Erie Railway (1886–1899)
 Wheeling and Lake Erie Railroad (1871–1886)